Aarón Sánchez (born February 12, 1976) is a Mexican-American celebrity chef, restaurateur, television personality, cookbook author and philanthropist. He is the executive chef and part-owner of the Mexican restaurant Johnny Sánchez in New Orleans.

He co-starred on Food Network's hit series Chopped and Chopped Jr. and hosted Cooking Channel's Emmy-nominated Taco Trip. He has appeared on Iron Chef America, and is one of the few chefs whose battles have ended in a draw, tying with Masaharu Morimoto in "Battle Black Bass" in Season 2. He was also a contestant on The Next Iron Chef. He is the author of two cookbooks, and had a memoir released October 1, 2019.  He launched the Aarón Sánchez Scholarship Fund to empower aspiring chefs from the Latin community to follow their dreams and attend culinary school. As of 2017, he is one of the judges/hosts of FOX's hit reality-TV culinary competition series MasterChef since Season 8 onwards after previously guest-starring in a select number of episodes in Season 7 as a guest judge, co-hosting alongside Gordon Ramsay, Joe Bastianich and Christina Tosi. He has also joined the judging panel of MasterChef Junior since its 7th season, which debuted in March 2019, after guest-starring in Season 5, which debuted early 2017.

Personal life
Aarón and his twin brother Rodrigo, an attorney in New York City, were born in 1976, in Chihuahua, Mexico to Zarela Martínez, a restaurateur and the author of several cookbooks, and Adolfo Sanchez and later moved to El Paso, Texas. He began cooking at an early age, helping his mother prepare traditional Mexican foods for her catering business. In 1984, the family moved to New York, and his mother launched the acclaimed Café Marimba, where Sánchez began to cook in a professional kitchen. At age 16, Sánchez's mother sent him to New Orleans to spend the summer working with Chef Paul Prudhomme. In 1994, Sánchez graduated from Dwight School, and began to work full-time for Prudhomme in New Orleans. Sánchez was married to singer Ifé Mora from 2009 until 2012.  He has a son named Yuma. On episode 21 of MasterChef season 9, he revealed that his mentor was Jonathan Waxman.

Career
In 1996, after working under Prudhomme, Aarón returned north to study culinary arts at Johnson & Wales University in Providence, Rhode Island. In 1996, he returned to New York, and worked in the kitchen at Patria under nuevo-Latino chef, Douglas Rodriguez. Sánchez met his future business partner, Alex Garcia while working there.

Garcia left Patria in 1996 to open Erizo Latino, taking Sánchez to help open the restaurant. Reviews were positive, referring to the restaurant as "casual" and "earthy," and "the fare is enticingly wholesome, and the kitchen's best dishes make a fine introduction to the cooking of Central and South America."

Sánchez then became executive chef at L-Ray, which specialized in foods from the Caribbean and Gulf of Mexico. This was followed by another executive chef position at Isla, a restaurant inspired by pre-Revolutionary Cuba. Sanchez then moved to San Francisco, working under Chef Reed Hearon at Rose Pistola.

Eamon Furlong hired Sánchez in 2000, to open Paladar, a pan-Latin restaurant on the Lower East Side. It opened in February 2001, and won Time Out New York's award for Best New Lower East Side Restaurant that year. It went on to be named the Best Latin American Restaurant in their 2002 Eating and Drinking Guide. Paladar had been reviewed as being "colorful, lively circus of a restaurant that’s equal parts serious cooking and serious partying," and was named a Critic's Pick by New York magazine. Sánchez sold his interest in the Paladar restaurant in 2010.

Sánchez went on to become chef of Mexican New York eatery Centrico, which closed in 2012.

He opened the restaurant Johnny Sánchez in Baltimore with fellow chef John Besh in August 2014. The Baltimore location closed in September 2017. The pair opened a second Johnny Sánchez location in October 2014 in New Orleans. As of February 2019, Besh is no longer a part of Johnny Sánchez; Aarón Sánchez and partners, Miles Landrem and Drew Mire, purchased and now own the restaurant. The three partners also are planning to develop a second restaurant in New Orleans, eyeing the Mid-City area, though the name and location have not been announced.

In 2017, he joined MasterChef US Season 8 as a judge alongside Gordon Ramsay and Christina Tosi, replacing Graham Elliot, to taste and help judge contestants' cooking and baking with Ramsay and Tosi in order to crown the next MasterChef. He is an expert in many cooking techniques and global cuisines, but his specialty of cooking traditional Mexican cuisine is often used throughout the season.

In 2019, he guest-starred on the first episode of Gordon Ramsay's 24 Hours to Hell and Back season 2 as an extra expeditor, and revealed he lives nearby The Trolley Café in New Orleans. Sánchez released a memoir, Where I Come From: Life Lessons From a Latino Chef, on October 1, 2019.

In 2020, he guest judged a Mexican food challenge on season 19 of Hell's Kitchen.

Television appearances

Bibliography
Cookbooks

La Comida del Barrio: Latin-American Cooking in the U.S.A., 2003, 
Simple Food Big Flavor: Unforgettable Mexican-Inspired Recipes from My Kitchen to Yours, 2011, 

Memoir

Where I Come From: Life Lessons From a Latino Chef, 2019,

References

External links

American male chefs
American television chefs
Living people
People from El Paso, Texas
1976 births
Food Network chefs
American people of Mexican descent
Johnson & Wales University alumni
[[Category:Judges in American reality television series]]